The following highways are numbered 595:

United States
  I-595
Interstate 595 (Florida), a spur from I-75 across I-95 to Fort Lauderdale, Florida
Interstate 595 (Maryland), an unsigned spur to Annapolis, Maryland
Interstate 595 (Virginia), a never-built upgrade for US 1 in Arlington, Virginia